The Voice of Vietnam's first season began on 8 July 2012 and ended on 13 January 2013. This series was part of the famous The Voice franchise and was based on the original version, The Voice of Holland. Four original coaches chosen were Đàm Vĩnh Hưng, Thu Minh, Hồ Ngọc Hà and Trần Lập.

This is the only series to feature Hồ Ngọc Hà and Trần Lập as coaches. Phạm Thị Hương Tràm was announced as the winner on January 13, 2013. A lot of contestants in this season then achieved certain successes and notable hit songs. This season proved to be a hit and the show was therefore renewed for a second season in the same year.

Teams

Episodes

Episodes 1-4: Blind Auditions (4 Parts) 
Starting from July 8 to July 29 at 9:30 pm – 11:30 pm slot, preceded by Đồ Rê Mí 2012.

Episode 1: Blind Auditions, Week 1
The first Blind Audition taped episode was broadcast on July 8, 2012.

Three unnamed contestants auditioned between Đinh T Thanh Hương and Nguyễn Hương Giang.  None of the coaches turned during their auditions, hence they were eliminated.

Episode 2: Blind Auditions, Week 2
The second Blind Audition taped episode was broadcast on July 15, 2012.

 †: Coach Trần Lập pushed Thu Minh and Hồ Ngọc Hà's buttons.

Episode 3: Blind Auditions, Week 3
The third Blind Audition taped episode was broadcast on July 21, 2012.

 Only Hồ Ngọc Hà was shown choosing the contestant.

Episode 4: Blind Auditions, Week 4
The final Blind Audition taped episode was broadcast on July 29, 2012.

 †: Coach Thu Minh pushed Hồ Ngọc Hà's button.

Episodes 5-8: The Battle Rounds (4 Weeks) 
Starting from August 19 to September 16 at 9:00 pm – 10:30 pm slot, preceded by Vietnam's Next Top Model.

Coaches begin narrowing down the playing field by training the contestants with the help of "trusted advisors." Each episode features battles consisting of pairings from within each team, and each battle concludes with the respective coach eliminating one of the two contestants. Seven winners for each coach advance to the live shows.
 – Battle Winner

Episodes 9-20: Liveshows (11 Liveshows and 1 Finale) 
Starting from September 23 to January 13 at 9:00 pm – 11:30 pm slot.

Detailed results

Contestants on other programs
Let's Get Loud
Lê Thị Lê Vy (2010 contestant)
Dương Trần Nghĩa (2010 first runner-up)

 Project Superstar Vietnam
Nguyễn Đức Quang (2007 second runner-up)
Hoàng Thị Uyên (2008 second runner-up)
Tiêu Châu Như Quỳnh (2009 winner)
Nguyễn Phú Luân (2009 second runner-up)
Hoàng Mạnh (2011 contestant)
Bùi Anh Tuấn (2011 winner)

 Sao Mai điểm hẹn / Sao Mai
Trần Hoàng Anh (season 4 finalist), eliminated in week 3
Phan Ngọc Luân (season 4 finalist), eliminated in week 3
Mai Khánh Linh (season 4 finalist), eliminated in week 5
Nguyễn Đức Quang (Sao Mai 2009 contestant)
Thiều Bảo Trang (Sao Mai 2011 contestant)

 Song ca cùng thần tượng
Phan Ngọc Luân with Đàm Vĩnh Hưng
Nguyễn Văn Thắng with Hồ Quỳnh Hương
K'sor Đức with Siu Black

 Tiếng ca học đường
Nguyễn Hoài Bảo Anh (2008 contestant)
Tiêu Châu Như Quỳnh (2009 second runner-up)

 Vietnam's Got Talent
Phạm Trần Thanh Phương and Đinh Thị Thanh Hương (season 1 contestants)
Nguyễn Ngọc Gia Bảo (season 1 semifinalist), eliminated in the 4th semifinal round

 Vietnam Idol
Trần Hoàng Anh (season 2 finalist, placed 9th)
Phan Ngọc Luân (season 2 semifinalist, season 3 contestant)
Nguyễn Văn Thắng (season 3 semifinalist)
Hà Văn Đông (season 3 contestant)
Lê Vũ Phương (season 4 contestant)
Ngô Duy Khiêm (season 4 contestant)
Trần Thị Tố Ny (season 4 contestant)
Nguyễn Hương Giang (season 4 finalist, placed 4th)

 Others
Ngô Duy Khiêm and Nguyễn Thị Thái Trinh gained notoriety as Internet memes for covering famous songs.

Trần Thị Kim Loan was the first season winner of Tiếng hát mãi xanh.
Hoàng Mạnh also belonged to Mỹ Lệ's group in Hợp ca tranh tài.
Nguyễn Đức Quang is a member of Artista group.
Vũ Thanh Hằng was a contestant of House of Dream: Sáng bừng sức sống, eliminated in the grand finale.
Tiêu Châu Như Quỳnh was a main singer of Bước nhảy hoàn vũ
Trần Hồng Dương is a member of M4U group.
Lương Minh Trí is the main vocalist of rock group Nu Voltage.
Phạm Dũng Hà won Material Prize at Vietnam Collection Grand Prix 2001, also took part in Vietnam Fashion Week 2001.

Controversy
On Sunday, September 9, 2012, a video was uploaded on YouTube by an anonymous account stating that the show's results were fixed. The video was deleted a few hours later; however, it was spread on social networks upon its deletion and caused a media uproar. The video showed email exchanges between who was believed to be The Voice's music director and several contestants and a recording between the director and a producer of the show. An urgent meeting was called at Cát Tiên Sa's headquarter a day later with the coaches and on-going as well as eliminated contestants. Phương Uyên - the show's music director apologized for what had happened but did not comment on the rumor about her close relationship with a contestant of the show, which was pointed out in the said video. H'zina Bya, who was said to quit because of being treated unfairly, explained the reason she quit was because of her health problem and thought that the show didn't fit her.

References

1
2010s Vietnamese television series
2012 Vietnamese television seasons
2013 Vietnamese television seasons